The 1997 Devon County Council election, was an election for all 79 seats on the council. Devon County Council was a county council that covered the majority of the ceremonial county of Devon. The elections took place concurrently with other local elections across England and Northern Ireland.

Election result 

|}

References

External links 

1997 English local elections
1997
1990s in Devon